The Tennessee River Gorge is a  canyon formed by the Tennessee River known locally as Cash Canyon. It is the fourth largest river gorge in the Eastern United States. The gorge is cut into the Cumberland Plateau as the river winds its way into Alabama from Tennessee.  The Tennessee River Gorge was also known as Walden Gorge. Walden Ridge originally extended across the present path of the Tennessee River at the gorge to Sand Mountain.

Ecology
The Tennessee River Gorge is home to endangered species like the mountain skullcap. Many archaeological sites have been discovered in the gorge that show that people have been dwelling in the canyon for at least 10,000 years.

History
Prior to the completion of Hales Bar Dam in 1913 and the subsequent raising of the water-level, the stretch of the Tennessee River flowing through the Gorge was notorious for its navigational hazards, whirlpools, eddies, shoals, and one huge rock. Beginning with Williams' Island and the sandbars on either side of it, these obstructions included Tumbling Shoals, the Holston Rock, the Kettle, the Suck Shoals, the Deadman's Eddy, the Pot, the Skillet, the Pan, and, finally, the ten-mile Narrows, ending with Hale's Bar. Of these, the Kettle, or the Suck as it is better known, at the mouth of Suck Creek is the most infamous, drawing notice from Thomas Jefferson, who had never been anywhere near the area, and lending its name to the entire stretch of treacherous river, which is also known locally by the name Cash Canyon.

As of 2018, 17,000 acres of land in the gorge out of 27,000 acres sought for preservation have been purchased or otherwise secured for conservation by the Tennessee River Gorge Trust, a non-profit conservation trust founded in 1981. The Trust also does scientific studies, develops trails, and conducts education efforts. The Prentice Cooper State Forest is on the northern edge of the gorge.

Image gallery

References

External links
Tennessee River Gorge Trust
Tennessee River Blueway

Canyons and gorges of Alabama
Archaeological sites in Alabama
Archaeological sites in Tennessee
Protected areas of Hamilton County, Tennessee
Protected areas of Marion County, Tennessee
Nature reserves in Tennessee
Canyons and gorges of the United States
Landforms of Hamilton County, Tennessee
Landforms of Marion County, Tennessee